The Asian Pacific American Labor Alliance (APALA) is a nonprofit organization of Asian-Pacific American trade union members affiliated with the AFL–CIO. It was the "first and only national organization for Asian Pacific American union members".

In the late 1980s and early 1990s, a number of AFL–CIO affiliates became concerned with sweatshop work and child labor as a threat to American jobs. Campaigns against these practices, coupled several sweatshop and slave labor scandals in the United States, created a growing awareness within the federation of the plight of Asian-Pacific American workers. Independent worker groups such as the Asian Immigrant Women's Advocates in the San Francisco, California, the Korean Immigrant Workers Advocates in Los Angeles, California, and Workers' Awaaz and the Chinese Staff and Workers' Association in New York City also helped the federation see the need for an Asian-Pacific American labor organization.

The Asian Pacific American Labor Alliance was founded on May 1, 1992, when 500 Asian-Pacific American labor activists met to found a new national labor organization to give Asian and Pacific Islander workers a more effective voice within the AFL–CIO and on labor issues nationally. APALA's first president was Kent Wong. Its first executive director was Matthew Finucane. Katie Quan chaired the founding convention.

APALA is the official voice of the 500,000 Asian and Pacific Islander labor union members in the AFL–CIO, and has 13 chapters in the U.S. APALA has been credited with shifting the AFL–CIO toward more actively organizing Asian Pacific workers. It has a biennial membership convention, which meets in even-numbered years.

APALA has two main goals. First, it works with the AFL–CIO Organizing Institute to train Asian and Pacific Islander workers in organizing techniques, and assists member unions of the AFL–CIO in organizing these workers of similar ethnic and racial background. APALA also works to build awareness of the labor movement among Asian-Pacific American workers. Second, APALA works to build awareness of and address exploitative conditions in industries with large numbers of Asian-Pacific American workers, such as the garment, electronics, hotel and restaurant, food processing, and health care industries.

Most recently, APALA has been working with the Leadership Conference on Civil Rights and the National Asian Pacific American Legal Consortium to educate union members and the Asian-Pacific American community on affirmative action issues.

APALA is also active in voter registration, education and mobilization, and is active in federal and state legislative efforts on immigration reform and the access of immigrants (legal and illegal) to social services.

APALA's president is Monica Thammarath, Senior Liaison at the National Education Association union. Executive director Gloria Caoile stepped down in March 2008. Malcolm Amado Uno, APALA's Deputy Director since August 2007, was tapped to replace her. Uno was previously the National Organizing Director of Asian Pacific Islander American Vote (APIAVote) and Policy and Outreach Coordinator for Preschool California. The current Executive Director is Alvina Yeh.

APALA is a member of the National Council of Asian Pacific Americans.

Notes

References
 Chen, May and Wong, Kent. "The Challenge of Diversity and Inclusion in the AFL-CIO." A New Labor Movement for the New Century. Gregory Mantsios, ed. New York City: Monthly Review Press, 1998. 
 Ejera, Bert. "Organized Labor Wants You: After Decades of Overt Exclusion, Big Labor Opens Its Doors to Asian Americans." AsianWeek August 30, 1996.
 Hing, Alex. "Organizing Asian Pacific American Workers in the AFL-CIO: New Opportunities." Amerasia Journal. 18:1 (1992).
 HoSang, Daniel. "Union Activists Launch APALA." Third Force. 2:1 (March 1994).
 Lee, Pam. "Asian Workers in U.S.: A Challenge to Labor." Labor Notes July 1993.
 Lee, Pam Tau. "Asian Workers in the U.S.: A Challenge for Labor." Amerasia Journal. 18:1 (1992).
 Li, David K. "Asian-American Labor Caucus Organized; Some Activists Fear Domination by AFL-CIO Leadership." Labor Notes. July 1992.
 Milkman, Ruth and Wong, Kent. "Organizing Immigrant Workers: Case Studies from Southern California." In Rekindling the Movement: Labor's Quest for 21st Century Relevance. Lowell Turner, Harry Katz and Richard Hurd, eds. Ithaca, N.Y.: ILR Press, 2001. 
 Mogado, Linelle. "From the Bottom Up: The New Asian Pacific Islander Labor Activism." ColorLines Summer 1999.
 Nishijima, Dan. "The Asian Pacific American Labor Alliance." CrossRoads. September 1992.
 Smucker, Sam. "Training Union Organizers in the Middle of a Fight: The AFL-CIO’s Organizing Institute." Labor Notes. November 2002.
 Wong, Kent. "Building An Asian Pacific Labor Movement." In Legacy to Liberation: Politics and Culture of Revolutionary Asian Pacific America. Fred Ho, ed. Oakland, Calif.: AK Press, 2000. 
 Wong, Kent. "Building Unions in Asian Pacific Communities." Amerasia Journal. 18:1 (1992).
 Wong, Kent; Monroe, Julie; and Yasuda, Kathleen, eds. Voices for Justice: Asian Pacific American Organizers and the New Labor Movement. Los Angeles: Center for Labor Research & Education, University of California, Los Angeles, 2001. 
 Wong, Janelle S. Democracy's Promise: Immigrants and American Civic Institutions. Ann Arbor, Mich.: University of Michigan Press, 2006. 
 Asian Pacific American Labor Alliance Endorses Congressman Keith Ellison for DNC Chair
 Asian Pacific American Labor Alliance Responds to Tragic Shooting in Olathe, Kansas
 Fil-Am is US trade unions’ highest-ranking Asian official

External links
 APALA Web site
 National Council of Asian Pacific Americans
 Voices of Asian Pacific American Labor in Los Angeles (includes profiles of many APALA leaders)

Trade unions in the United States
AFL–CIO
Trade unions established in 1992
Asian-American organizations
Non-profit organizations based in Washington, D.C.
Pacific Islands American history
 
1992 establishments in the United States